Mitogen-activated protein kinase 10 also known as c-Jun N-terminal kinase 3 (JNK3) is an enzyme that in humans is encoded by the MAPK10 gene.

Function 

The protein encoded by this gene is a member of the MAP kinase family. MAP kinases act as an integration point for multiple biochemical signals, and are involved in a wide variety of cellular processes such as proliferation, differentiation, transcription regulation and development. This protein is a neuronal-specific form of c-Jun N-terminal kinases (JNKs). Through its phosphorylation and nuclear localization, this kinase plays regulatory roles in the signaling pathways during neuronal apoptosis. Beta-arrestin 2, a receptor-regulated MAP kinase scaffold protein, is found to interact with, and stimulate the phosphorylation of this kinase by MAP kinase kinase 4 (MKK4). Cyclin-dependent kinase 5 can phosphorylate, and inhibit the activity of this kinase, which may be important in preventing neuronal apoptosis. Four alternatively spliced transcript variants encoding distinct isoforms have been reported.

Interactions 

MAPK10 has been shown to interact with MAPK8IP3.

References

Further reading

External links 
 MAP Kinase Resource  .
 

EC 2.7.11